Helicophanta magnifica, common name the magnificent helicophanta, is a species of air-breathing land snail, a terrestrial pulmonate gastropods mollusk in the family Acavidae. The shell of this species can reach a length of 75–85 mm. The species occurs in Madagascar.

References
Zipcodezoo
Discover Life
Conchology.be
Worldwide Mollusc Species Data Base

Acavidae
Gastropods described in 1821